Princes Park or Prince's Park may refer to:

 Princes Park (Auburn), a sports ground in Sydney, New South Wales, Australia
 Princes Park (Dartford), a football stadium in Kent, England
 Princes Park (Liverpool ward), a Liverpool City Council Ward
 Prince's Park, Burntwood, a park in Staffordshire, England
 Princes Park, Carlton, a park in Carlton North, Melbourne, Australia
 Princes Park (stadium), an Australian rules football ground in the park 
 Princes Park, Eastbourne, a park in East Sussex, England
 Prince's Park, Liverpool, a park in Toxteth, Liverpool, England
 Princes Park, Retie, a park in Antwerp Province, Flanders, Belgium
 Princes Park, Temple Fortune, a park in the London Borough of Barnet, North London, England

See also
 Parc des Princes, a sports stadium in Paris, France